Kosovelje is a small village north of Pliskovica in the Municipality of Sežana in the Littoral region of Slovenia.

References

External links
Kosovelje on Geopedia

Populated places in the Municipality of Sežana